Tayfun Taşdemir (born November 5, 1975) is a world champion Turkish professional carom billiards player specialized in three-cushion event.

Early years 
Tayfun Taşdemir was born in Muş, eastern Turkey on November 5, 1975. He graduated in Economics from Marmara University.

Career 
He played three years for the Dutch team Twentevisie.

After enjoying World team champion titles several times, Taşdemir finally won his first individual world-class level title at the 3rd leg of the 2015 Three-Cushion World Cup in Ho Chi Minh City, Vietnam defeating Torbjörn Blomdahl from Sweden in the final. He also won the 1st leg of the 2019 Three-Cushion World Cup in Antalya, Turkey defeating Cho Jae-ho.

At the 2022 UMB World Three-cushion Championship held in Donghae City, South Korea, he became World champion in the individual event. He is the second Turkish World champion after Semih Saygıner, who won the title in 2003.

Achievements 
 2002
  UMB World Three-cushion Championship for National Teams, Viersen, Germany

 2003
  UMB World Three-cushion Championship for National Teams, Viersen, Germany

 2004
  UMB World Three-cushion Championship for National Teams, Viersen, Germany

 2005
  Three-Cushion World Cup Leg 4, Istanbul, Turkey

 2006
  Three-Cushion World Cup Leg 5, Istanbul, Turkey

 2009
  Three-Cushion World Cup Leg 1, Sluiskil, Netherlands
  Three-Cushion World Cup Leg 5, Hurghada, Egypt
  CEB European Three-cushion Championship, Odense, Denmark

 2010
  Three-Cushion World Cup Leg 2, Suwon, South Korea
  CEB European Three-cushion Championship, Sankt Wendel, Germany

 2011
  UMB World Three-cushion Championship for National Teams, Viersen, Germany

 2012
  Three-Cushion World Cup Leg 1, Antalya, Turkey

 2013
  Three-Cushion World Cup Leg 3, Corinth, Greece
  Three-Cushion World Cup Leg 5, Hurghada, Egypt
  UMB World Three-cushion Championship for National Teams, Viersen, Germany

 2014
  UMB World Three-cushion Championship for National Teams, Viersen, Germany

 2015
  Three-Cushion World Cup Leg 3, Ho Chi Minh City, Vietnam
  Three-Cushion World Cup Leg 4, Guri, South Korea
  UMB World Three-cushion Championship for National Teams, Viersen, Germany

 2022
  UMB World Three-cushion Championship, Donghae City, South Korea

References

External links 

1975 births
People from Muş
Marmara University alumni
Turkish carom billiards players
Three-cushion billiards players
Turkish expatriate sportspeople in the Netherlands
Expatriate sportspeople in the Netherlands
Living people
20th-century Turkish people
21st-century Turkish people
World champions in three-cushion billiards